Khuniksar (also Romanized as Khūnīḵsār) is a village in Qohestan Rural District of Qohestan District, Darmian County, South Khorasan province, Iran. At the 2006 National Census, its population was 943 in 236 households. The following census in 2011 counted 981 people in 280 households. The latest census in 2016 showed a population of 1,118 people in 280 households; it was the largest village in its rural district.

References 

Darmian County

Populated places in South Khorasan Province

Populated places in Darmian County